Abazari is a surname. Notable people with the surname include:

Saleh Abazari (born 1998), Iranian karateka
Arash Abazari, Iranian philosopher and author of Hegel's Ontology of Power